The Staatliche Antikensammlungen (State Collections of Antiquities) is a museum in Munich's Kunstareal holding Bavaria's collections of antiquities from Greece, Etruria and Rome, though the sculpture collection is located in the opposite Glyptothek and works created in Bavaria are on display in a separate museum. Ancient Egypt also has its own museum.

History of the building
The neo-classical building at Königsplatz with Corinthian columns was established in 1848 as counterpart to the opposite Glyptothek and commissioned by the Bavarian King Ludwig I. The architect was Georg Friedrich Ziebland. Already from 1869 to 1872 the building housed the royal antiquarium before the Munich Secession resided here from 1898 to 1912.  From 1919 the building contained the New State Gallery. The museum building was severely damaged by bombing in World War II but was reconstructed and reopened to the public in the late 1960s to display the State Collection of Antiques.

Collections

The State Collection of Antiquities is based on the Wittelsbach antique collections, especially the collection of attic vases of King Ludwig I. 
In 1831 his agent Martin von Wagner acquired pottery from the archeological excavation in Vulci, his agent Friedrich Thiersch purchased by auction the antiques from the estate of Lucien Bonaparte. The king acquired also antique gold jewellery from the collection of Caroline Murat, Etruscan  bronzes excavated in Perugia and Greek terra-cottas from South Italy.

After the king's death in 1868 his collection was united with the Wittelsbach antique collection which was founded already by Albert V, Duke of Bavaria. Later the museum got extended by purchase and  donations. Among these private collections are the donations of Paul Arndt (1908), of James Loeb (1933), and of Hans von Schoen (1964). These comprehensive collections specialised in smaller antique objects, glassware, bronzes, terra-cottas, jewelry, gold and silver. During World War II the museum lost especially Etruscan pottery, which was stored in the bombed Neue Pinakothek.

Permanent exhibition

Antique pottery and Terracotta
The internationally renowned collection of antique pottery is outstanding, comparable only with the collections of the Louvre and the British Museum. On display is already Cycladic art. The Mycenaean pottery is represented as well as the pottery from the geometric, the archaic, the classical and the Hellenistic period in Greece.

The museum exhibits artworks of the most famous Greek potters and painters like the Amasis Painter, Exekias, Archikles, Glaukytes, the Penthesilea Painter, the Andokides Painter, Oltos, Kleophon, Phintias, Euphronios, Euthymides, Epiktetos, the Pan Painter, the Berlin Painter, Hieron, Makron, Douris, the Brygos Painter, the Acheloos Painter and Lydos.

The collection contains numerous masterpieces such as the Belly Amphora by the Andokides Painter ( between 520 and 510 BC) and the Dionysus cup by Exekias (circa 530 BC).

One of the masterpieces of Etruscan art is a head vessel depicting the Etruscan demon Charun (400-350 BC).

The Standing Woman is a notable statuette of terracotta (Boeotia from the crossing of 5. by the 4th century B.C.). The Beauty is one of the best preserved ancient terracotta figures in the world. It was made in the early 3rd century BC and was found in the vicinity of Athens.

Jewellery, precious metal, bronzes and glass

An outstanding example for antique jewelry is the gold Funerary Garland from Armento (4th century BC). A Golden Diadem from the Black Sea, an elaborately decorated headdress from the Crimean Peninsula was produced in around 150 BC.

A famous Roman Goblet from Cologne made of reticella (or network) glass (4th century AD) still shows its Latin inscription BIBE MULTIS ANNIS (Drink many years yet!). It was a present of the City of Cologne in return for King Ludwig's support for the completion of Cologne Cathedral.

The silver drinking bowl from the 5th century BC. and a bowl of rare transparent soda-lime glass (500-450 BC) represent Achaemenid Persia. The Corinthian helmet from the tomb of Dendas comes from a Greek workshop in southern Italy, 500-490 BC. Chr.  The Goddess of Beauty and Love is a masterpiece of Hellenistic bronze art and dates back to around 100 BC.

Portraits and gems
An antique mummy portrait which originates from around 140 AD depicts a young upper-class man of imperial Egypt belongs to the most beautiful and best-quality antique mummy portraits that exist.

Part of the Staatliche Antikensammlungen is also a comprehensive collection of ca 800 engraved gems donated by Helmut Hansmann (1924-1996).

References

External links

Staatliche Antikensammlungen (English)
Staatliche Antikensammlungen (German)

 
Museums in Munich
Art museums and galleries in Germany
Neoclassical architecture in Munich
Archaeological museums in Germany
Greek Revival architecture in Germany
Maxvorstadt
1848 establishments in Germany
Museums of ancient Greece in Germany
Museums of ancient Rome in Germany